Unión Deportiva Fraga is a Spanish football team based in Fraga, in the autonomous community of Aragon. Founded in 1947 it plays in Tercera División – Group 17, holding home games at La Estacada, with a capacity of 3,000 seats.

History 

The club was founded in 1947. It debuted for the first time in a national competition of Spain. In 1987 the club was made semi-professional.

Stadium 
Fraga plays its games at the La Estacada Stadium, with a capacity of three thousand spectators. Currently the playing surface is made of artificial grass.

Season to season

4 seasons in Segunda División B
28 seasons in Tercera División

Notable coaches
 Juan Carlos Oliva

References

External links
Official website 
Futbolaragon team profile 

Football clubs in Aragon
Association football clubs established in 1947
Divisiones Regionales de Fútbol clubs
1947 establishments in Spain